Canterbury Archaeological Trust (CAT) is an independent charity formed in 1975 to undertake rescue excavation, research, publication and the presentation of the results of its work for the benefit of the public.

The Trust's main activities are to:
 carry out archaeological excavations in Canterbury, its district and the county of Kent.
 record standing buildings.
 manage the Archaeology in Education Service (AES) for Kent schools and colleges.
 publish reports of the Trust's investigations, both popular and academic.
 provide planning advice for archaeology to Canterbury City Council
 act as the Investigating Authority for the Canterbury Area of Archaeological Importance.

The Trust's base of operations is at 92A Broad Street, Canterbury. This is where the administrative offices are located and the finds department and post-excavation offices. The Trust's library, which includes the collection of the Canterbury Archaeological Society, is open by appointment to students and members of the public.

The work of the Trust is supported by the Friends of the Canterbury Archaeological Trust (FCAT).

Staff 
 Director: Alison Hicks
 Deputy Director: Mark Houliston

References 

Archaeological organizations
City of Canterbury
Organisations based in Kent
Archaeological sites in Kent
Archaeology of England
Organizations established in 1975
1975 establishments in England